The Kasereck, at , is one of the highest peaks of the Schladming Tauern and thus also the Lower Tauern. It is the most prominent summit on the crest that runs from the Hochgolling southwards and separates the valleys of Göriachtal in the west and Lessachtal in the east.
Geographically this mountain lies in Salzburg state and is most easily climbed from Göriach in the Lungau.

Below the mountain nestles the lake of Piendlsee. The easiest ascent runs from the  Göriacher Winkel from the Piendlalm via the Piendlsee and the southwest arête and west flank to the top.

Neighbouring summits 

 Kreuzhöhe (2,566 m)
 Kampelfenster (2,557 m)
 Wirriegelhöhe (2,600 m)
 Weißhöhe (2,646 m)
 Hochgolling (2,862 m)
 Hocheck (2,638 m)
 Lesshöhe (2,490 m)
 Gensgitsch (2,279 m)
 Gummaberg (2,315 m)

References

Two-thousanders of Austria
Mountains of the Alps
Mountains of Salzburg (state)
Schladming Tauern